Silvia Peppoloni is an Italian geologist, researcher in the field of natural hazards and risks, science writer, international frontline scholar on geoethics.

Early life and education 

Silvia Peppoloni was born and lives in Rome, Italy. Since she was a child, she was fascinated by geological phenomena. For hours she used to listen astonished to her grandfather's stories about the 1944 eruption of the Vesuvius Volcano, feeling the fear and the wonder, the sense of impotence and precariousness in front of those processes, the perception of the Earth as a "living" planet. This is the origin of her love for geosciences.

She has a background in humanities: she obtained the classical high school diploma at the Italian upper secondary school. Keen on music, she studied piano from the age of 8 years and lyrical singing from 20. Singer in polyphonic and symphonic choirs, in 1994 she won the public competition and became a soprano of the youth Choir "Luca Marenzio" of the National Academy of S. Cecilia, directed by Norbert Balatsch. From 1995 to 1999 she was the solo singer of the Mediterranean popular music groups "La Paranza" and "I Tamburi del Vesuvio" di Nando Citarella, and in 2005 of the medieval music group "Symphonia Medioevale".

In 1996 she earned a master's degree on Geosciences from Sapienza University of Rome, in 1997 she obtained the professional qualification and enrolment in the geologists' register, and in 2001 received her PhD in Earth Sciences. Her initial skills were in geomorphology and tectonics. Subsequently, she devoted herself to the study of engineering geology, in particular to its application in the seismic field, to seismic microzonation studies and the analyses of local seismic amplification effects. Currently she works in the field of natural hazards and risks, with a focus on the aspects of geoscience communication and education.

During her university studies she cooperated with the Center for Television Applications and Distance Education Techniques (CATTID) of the Sapienza University of Rome to create tools and supports for students with disabilities.

Career and impact 
She is a PhD geologist, researcher at the National Institute of Geophysics and Volcanology (Rome, Italy). Her scientific activities are focused on natural risks and hazards, geomorphology, engineering geology, and ethical and social aspects of Earth sciences. She is involved in the base research on philosophy of geosciences, social geosciences and geoethics, and on practical application of geoethical thinking to geoscience education and communication.

Peppoloni was Professor of geology and applied geology at the Sapienza University of Rome and the Tuscia University (2008–2011), and in the PhD course in "Landscape and Environment" at the Sapienza University of Rome – Faculty of Architecture (2008–2016), she has cooperated with the Polytechnic University of Milan, University of Genoa, Roma Tre University, and the National Research Council (Italy).

She is founding member and Secretary General of the International Association for Promoting Geoethics International Association for Promoting Geoethics, Councillor 2018–2022 of the International Union of Geological Sciences, Chair of the Ethical Advisory Board of the Integrated Carbon Observation System, member of the Standing Committee for Gender Equality in Science of the International Science Council, member of the executive committee of the International Association for Engineering Geology and the Environment – Italian section and Councillor of the Italian Geological Society. She has been member of Advisory Boards of H2020 European projects (ENVRIplus, EPOS SP, and ENGIE). Silvia Peppoloni is Editor-in-chief of the Journal of Geoethics and Social Geosciences, and of the SpringerBriefs in Geoethics and Director of the School on Geoethics and Natural Issues, that she founded in 2019 with the aim to improve the dissemination of geoethics and to train people in developing a geoethical thinking. She is editor of books and articles on geoethics.

She runs the blog entitled "Storie di Gea" Storie di Gea in the online magazine ReWriters, where she writes on scientific, ethical, social and political issues relating to the environment, geosciences and global anthropogenic challenges  of our times. She collaborates with national newspapers such as Corriere della Sera and its cultural supplement La Lettura, and  other magazines such as MicroMega and CiviltàAppennino.

She is known for her fundamental contribution to the definition, development, and promotion of geoethics. She is co-author of the Geoethical Promise, an Hippocratic-like oath for geoscientists, and the Cape Town Statement on Geoethics, a document summarizing values, concepts, and contents related to geoethical thinking, translated in 35 languages. She is working on create awareness about "the growing impact of human activities on bio-geological systems" and how to promote geoethics as a responsible way of thinking and managing the planet for creating safe and healthy interactions among humans and other biotic and abiotic entities forming the Earth system. Her studies and activities have put the foundations of geoethics and greatly contributed to developing its theoretical structure and practical applications. She also contributed with subjects on "Geoethics in Disaster Risk Reduction" for the course "A Resilient Future: Science and Technology for Disaster Risk Reduction", organized by the École Polytechnique Fédérale de Lausanne (Switzerland).

Awards and honors 
As science writer, Peppoloni received the following awards:
 Special Award of the Jury – XX Edition of the Italian Prize of Naturalistic Literature "Parco Majella" 2017 (Category: Literary Essays)
 Third place in the grand final of the 2016 Italian Award for Science Dissemination category "Mathematical, Physical and Natural Sciences", with the book: Planet Earth (Pianeta Terra" (transl.), Il Mulino, Bologna (Italy)
 Finalist of the Italian Prize for Science Dissemination 2014 (Category: Mathematical, Physical and Natural Sciences)

Selected works 
 Peppoloni Silvia e Di Capua Giuseppe. Geoethics: Manifesto for an Ethics of Responsibility Towards the Earth. 2022, Springer, Cham, XII+123 pp., ISBN 978-3030980436. https://doi.org/10.1007/978-3-030-98044-3.
 Peppoloni Silvia e Di Capua Giuseppe. GEOETICA: manifesto per un'etica della responsabilità verso la Terra. 2021, Saggine, n. 346, pp. 224, Donzelli Editore, . 
 
 Peppoloni Silvia, Di Capua Giuseppe, Bobrowsky Peter, Cronin Vince (Eds.). Geoethics at the heart of all geoscience. 2017, Annals of Geophysics, Vol 60, Fast Track 7.
 Doglioni, Carlo e Peppoloni Silvia. (2016), Pianeta Terra. Una storia non finita, pp. 160, Il Mulino, Bologna, .

References

External links 

Living people
Year of birth missing (living people)
21st-century Italian geologists
Sapienza University of Rome alumni
21st-century Italian women writers
Italian geophysicists